Candy is an all-female Malaysian rock band formed in 1996. Originating from Kuching, Sarawak, they were entered into the Malaysian Book of Records as the first all-women band in Malaysia.

Candy found fame with their first album Candy which went Platinum, when the hit single Akan Ku Tunggu was released in 1997.

Candy's best known line-up comprised Patricia Robert (lead vocals and guitar), Mary Morss (lead guitar and vocals), Cornie Sangid (drums, percussion and vocals) and Nancy Graggory (bass guitar and vocals).

History

Pre-Candy years (1988–1996)
In 1988, in her hometown of Kuching, band founder Mary persuaded her younger sister Cornie to bring together a group of friends to form a band. The original line-up consisted of Mary Morss (guitars and vocals), Cornie Sangid (drums), Magdalen Julita Tom (bass guitar), Veronica Ng (vocals) and Marilyn Ryne (vocals). They called themselves The Sapphire Gals.

Though essentially they were an all-female band they were joined by keyboardist Rodney Hughes who was the only male member of the band. Rodney left in 1989 and for a while the band was without a keyboardist. Marilyn Ryne and Veronica also left the band around this time and Meggry Graggory took over the vocal duties.

In 1990, keyboardist Yolanda Entika joined the group and the band's name was changed to D'Rozza. Around the same time, Magdalene Julita left and was replaced by Nancy Graggory, who is the older sister of Meggry. Cornie split her time between playing drums in the band and recording a solo Iban album.

In 1992, Casaphia Studio took them under its wing, and the band changed its name to G-Saphia. The "G” stood for "Girls". Keyboardist Danita Ng joined the band for a short stint. Within the same year, her younger sister Janice took over from her but even Janice did not stay long and left before the year was over. Around this time, Meggry also left the band and was replaced by Patricia Robert who was an Iban recording artist and a singer in the Sarawak State Ministry of Social Development and Urbanization.

In 1994, keyboardist Ophelia June joined G-Saphia. Ophelia is the younger sister of Rodney Hughes.

The band, under the names of Sapphire Gals and G-Saphia, performed in private and public functions around Kuching, and also in other towns in Sarawak. The functions included events such as the Malaysia National Day celebration and Malaysia Police Day.

Candy (1996–present)
In 1996 Ophelia June left the band, and the four remaining members left their hometown of Kuching and moved to Kuala Lumpur to record their first album. The band also changed their name to Candy.

Candy (now made up of Mary Morss, Cornie Sangid, Nancy Graggory and Patricia Robert) relocated to Kuala Lumpur in 1996. Patricia Robert took up the second guitarist role and continues to be the lead singer. Under the guidance of producer Edrie Hashim Candy spent 1996 recording their first album "Candy", and released it in 1997. The single "Akan Ku Tunggu" became a hit.

In 1998 Candy recorded their second album "Hot" with producer Mat Noh Hendrix at the helm. Mat Noh was chosen for his experience in performing, recording and producing in a heavy metal band – he was a member of the heavy metal band Rusty Blade. Unlike in the first album Patricia Robert did not do all the lead vocals. Nancy sang lead vocals in the tracks "Warisan", "Emansipasi", "Puas Hatiku" and "Taufan Yang Kecewa", while "Resah"	had Cornie singing the lead vocals. Singer Royce Sa'yan sang the backing vocals in the song "Emansipasi". The album also contained a cover of the Iron Maiden instrumental piece "Transylvania".

Nancy Graggory left Candy in 1999, citing personal reasons. Jacqueline Chong of The Beads replaced her. Jacqueline played bass during Candy's live shows from 1999 to 2004 but never recorded an album with them.

In 2004 Jacqueline Chong left Candy to pursue her studies and Nancy Gregory rejoined the band.

In October 2008 Candy completed the recording of their third studio album called Candy:Absolute.

Discography

Albums
 Candy (1997) Platinum
"Akan Ku Tunggu"
"Persada Harapan"
"Jaringan"
"Suara Hatiku"
"Bebas Semula"
"Dunia Baru"
"Bagaikan Permata"
"Akukah Yang Bersalah"
"Osmosis"
"Abadi"
 Hot (1999)
"Warisan"
"Racun Pujangga"
"Emansipasi"
"Inikah Keadilan"
"Ikrar Perwira"
"Puas Hatiku"
"Transylvania" (instrumental, Copyright Controlled – Steve Harris)
"Taufan Yang Kecewa"
"Biasalah Beb"
"Nyanyian Zaman Buaian"
"Tong Kosong"
"Resah"

 Absolute (2008)
"Kerana Dia"
"Creep"
"Terasing"
"Still in My Life"
"Takkan Pernah"
"Leave Me Alone"
"I Still Want You"
"The Chase (On-On)"
"Let Go"
"Nyanyian Alam"

References

Malaysian rock music groups
All-female bands
Malaysian hard rock musical groups
Musical groups established in 1996